The 1979 Volta a Catalunya was the 59th edition of the Volta a Catalunya cycle race and was held from 5 September to 12 September 1979. The race started and finished in Sitges. The race was won by Vicente Belda of the  team.

General classification

References

1979
Volta
1979 in Spanish road cycling
September 1979 sports events in Europe